Two vessels of the Royal Navy have borne the name HMS Launceston:

  was a 40-gun fifth-rate ship in service from 1711 and broken up at Deptford Dockyard in 1726.
  was a 44-gun fifth-rate ship in service from 1741 to 1784.

See also

References
 
 

Royal Navy ship names